The 1847 United Kingdom general election was conducted between 29 July 1847 and 26 August 1847 and resulted in the Whigs in control of government despite candidates calling themselves Conservatives winning the most seats. The Conservatives were divided between Protectionists, led by Lord Stanley, and a minority of free-trade Tories, known also as Liberal Conservatives or the Peelites for their leader, former prime minister Sir Robert Peel. This left the Whigs, led by Prime Minister Lord John Russell, in a position to continue in government.

The Irish Repeal group won more seats than in the previous general election, while the Chartists gained the only seat they were ever to hold, Nottingham's second seat, held by Chartist leader Feargus O'Connor.

The election also witnessed the election of Britain's first Jewish MP, the Liberal Lionel de Rothschild in the City of London. Members being sworn in were however required to swear the Christian Oath of Allegiance, meaning Rothschild was unable actually to take his seat until the passage of the Jews Relief Act in 1858. The constituency of Sudbury, which elected two members, was disfranchised for this election. This accounts there being two fewer seats in the House of Commons as compared to the previous election, though no redistribution took place.

Results

|}

Voting summary

Seats summary

Regional results

Great Britain

England

Scotland

Wales

Ireland

Universities

Notes

References

Further reading

External links
 Spartacus: Political Parties and Election Results

1847 elections in the United Kingdom
General election
1847
July 1847 events
August 1847 events
1840s elections in Ireland
1847 United Kingdom general election